Gagitodes omnifasciaria is a moth in the family Geometridae first described by Inoue in 1998. It is found in Taiwan.

References

Moths described in 1998
Perizomini